George Cooper may refer to:

Politicians
 George Cooper (Poole MP) (1626–1689), English politician
 George Cooper (Canadian politician) (born 1941), Canadian Member of Parliament for Halifax, 1979–1980
 George Cooper (Bermondsey MP) (1844–1909), Member of Parliament for Bermondsey, 1906–1909
 George B. Cooper (politician) (1808–1866), U.S. Representative from Michigan
 George W. Cooper (1851–1899), U.S. Representative from Indiana
 George Cooper (public servant) (1793–1867), first Colonial Treasurer of New Zealand

Sports
 George Cooper (American football) (born 1984), American football player
 George Cooper (cricketer) (1907–2000), Australian cricketer
 George Cooper (umpire) (1907–1980), Australian cricket Test match umpire
 George E. Cooper, head coach of American college football teams in the 1920s
 George Cooper (footballer, born 1932) (1932–1994), English footballer for Crystal Palace and Rochdale
 George Cooper (footballer, born 1996), English footballer for Plymouth Argyle
 George Cooper (footballer, born 2002), English footballer for Mansfield Town

Military
 Sir George Cooper (British Army officer) (1925–2020), Adjutant-General to the Forces in the United Kingdom
 George Franklin Cooper, United States Navy officer
 George H. Cooper (1821–1891), United States Navy rear admiral

Fictional characters
George Cooper, Sr., character in Young Sheldon, Sheldon's father
George Cooper, Jr., character in Young Sheldon, Sheldon's brother
 George Cooper (Tortallan character), fictional character from Tamora Pierce's Tortall novels

Others
 George Cooper (actor) (1892–1943), American actor of the silent era
 George Cooper (organist) (1820–1876), English organist
 George Cooper (poet) (1840–1927), American poet
 George A. Cooper (1925–2018), British actor
 George A. Cooper (director) (1894–1947), British screenwriter and film director
 George B. Cooper (historian) (1916–1995), American historian of British history
 George S. Cooper (1864–1929), American architect
 Buster Cooper (George Cooper, 1929–2016), American jazz trombonist
 Felix Morrow (1906–1988), American political activist and publisher, who used "George Cooper" as a pseudonym in the early 1930s